Marie Russak (October 7, 1865 – March 4, 1945), also known as Marie Hotchener or Marie Barnard, was an American opera singer and architect.

Biography
Born on October 7, 1865 in the small city of Four Corners, Butte County in northern California, she studied music at Mills College in Oakland. She became a renowned singer, performing in several European cities. In 1899, she married the opera producer Frank Russak and moved to Paris, France with him in 1901. She was deeply interested in Theosophy and became active in the  Theosophical Society.

Between 1906 and 1910 she lived in Adyar (Chennai), India, where she deepened her study of esoterism and Theosophy. She participated actively in Co-Masonry, and in 1912 she co-founded the Order of the Temple of the Rosy Cross with Annie Besant. She worked actively with the Rosicrucians until the group was dissolved in 1918.

Soon after leaving India in 1912, Marie helped to found the Krotona Colony. She held a substantial role in building Krotona and designed a number of houses for Theosophists including a well known house at 6106 Temple Hill Drive.

Russak continued to work in the Theosophical Society and was contacted in California by Harvey Spencer Lewis, who in 1915 had founded AMORC. She transmitted much of the esoteric knowledge that she had acquired, and she collaborated with the elaboration of some rituals, which were similar to those made of the OTRC.

Marie Russak was also involved in architectural design, and her work can still be seen in Krotona, California. Some of her designs were inspired by Moorish and Mission styles. One of her buildings, Moorcrest (probably completed in 1921) was rented by Charlie Chaplin before its sale in 1925 to the parents of Mary Astor, Mr. and Mrs. Otto Langhanke. Moorcrest fell into a state of decrepitude and rapidly lost market value throughout the 1990s. The house was finally bought in the early 2000s and the new owner put it under major renovations. Moorcrest went back on the market for $9 million in 2006. In 2014 it was bought by Joanna Newsom and Andy Samberg. 

Marie Russak was born Mary Ellen Barnard, the daughter of Judge Allyn Matther Barnard of California; she later took the stage name of Marie Ellene Barna. She married first, professor, author and later Pulitzer Prize winner Justin Harvey Smith on May 22, 1892 in Boston, Massachusetts; they divorced in 1895.  She married second, Frank Russak on September 19, 1899 in Newport, New York; he died in 1914.  She married third, Henry Hotchener on 10 Jul 1916 in Los Angeles, California.  Russak died on March 4, 1945, in Hollywood, California.

References 

1865 births
1945 deaths
American women architects
Rosicrucians
American Theosophists
20th-century American architects
Architects from California
People from Butte County, California